Laurel Amy Eva Campbell (15 March 1902–3 January 1971) was a New Zealand racehorse trainer. She was born in Doyleston, North Canterbury, New Zealand on 15 March 1902.

References

1902 births
1971 deaths
New Zealand racehorse owners and breeders
People from Doyleston
20th-century New Zealand women